Zhongshanba Station, formerly Zhongshan Balu Station during planning, is a station on Line 5 of the Guangzhou Metro. It is located under the junction of Zhongshan 8th Road and Huangsha Avenue in the commercial area of the Liwan District, near Liwan Lake and Guangzhou-Foshan Coach Terminal. It opened on 28December 2009.

Station layout

Exits

References

Railway stations in China opened in 2009
Guangzhou Metro stations in Liwan District